Nancy Boyda (born August 2, 1955) is an American chemist and politician. On November 4, 2008, Boyda was defeated for re-election to a second term by Kansas State Treasurer Lynn Jenkins.

Early life, education, and career 
Boyda graduated with honors from William Jewell College in Liberty, Missouri, where she received dual degrees in chemistry and education. She began her career in 1978 working as an analytical chemist and field inspector. Boyda grew up in a Republican family and later became a Democrat in 2003.

U.S. House of Representatives

Elections 
2004
In 2004 she ran against Republican incumbent U.S. Congressman Jim Ryun in Kansas' Second District. Boyda criticized Ryun's support for school vouchers and his lack of support for public schools. She said she had left the Republican Party because it had become too conservative. Ryun criticized her for taking part in protests against the Iraq War. Boyda spent $1.1 million on her campaign, $300,000 of it her own money. Ryun spent $1.2 million. George W. Bush carried the district 59%-39% and Ryun defeated Boyda 56%-41%. The only county Boyda had won during the election was Crawford.

2006

Boyda challenged Ryun again in 2006. The district was low on both national parties' political radars. Boyda was helped by the successful re-election bid of Governor Kathleen Sebelius, who won 57% to 40%. Ryun was a strongly conservative Republican and the Republican Party of Kansas had been rife with infighting between conservatives and moderates; moderate Republicans seem to have defected to both Sebelius and Boyda. There was also the issue of Ryun's purchase of a Washington, D.C. townhouse from Tom DeLay associates at a price well below market value. She defeated Ryun by 51% to 47%.

2008

In January 2007, National Republican Congressional Committee Chairman Tom Cole announced that the NRCC intended to target Boyda in 2008. Ryun announced that he would try to get his old seat back, and Republican leaders reportedly assured him that he would win. On April 4, 2007, State Treasurer Lynn Jenkins officially announced she would run in the Republican primary. She defeated State Senator Dennis Pyle in the primary.

Boyda and Jenkins were opposed in the general election by Libertarian Party candidate Robert Garrard and Reform Party candidate Leslie Martin. Boyda announced that, unlike in 2006, she would not seek assistance from the Democratic Congressional Campaign Committee for her 2008 campaign. She said that "Kansas voters should control Kansas campaigns" and that Kansans should be able to "run our election without Washington interference". The National Republican Congressional Committee spent heavily on behalf of Jenkins, who defeated Boyda 51% to 46%. In April 2009, DCCC Chairman Chris Van Hollen said that Boyda left him a message saying that she regretted turning down the organisation's assistance and asked Van Hollen to play the message to any vulnerable Democrat who was considering turning down the committee's assistance. Van Hollen said that Boyda "has been very clear about the fact that she made a mistake... she clearly felt that not participating [with the DCCC's help] was a good part of the reason she failed."

Tenure 

Boyda, as a freshman, introduced a bill, to deny pensions to members of Congress convicted of bribery, conspiracy or perjury charges. The Bill passed in the House of Representatives on January 23, 2007, by a vote of 431–0.  Boyda also applied to join the House Blue Dog Coalition, a caucus of conservative Democratic representatives.  She was unable to join as adding her would have put the Blue Dogs over their membership limit of 47.

On May 10, 2007, Boyda voted against , a measure, "to provide for the redeployment of United States Armed Forces and defense contractors from Iraq." However, she continues to support gradual troop withdrawal while funding troops until they return.

Environmental record
Boyda supported research toward renewable forms of energy, particularly ethanol and biodiesel production that could benefit Kansas agriculture.

Armed Services Committee hearing in July 2007
Congresswoman Boyda made news on July 27, 2007 by leaving a Congressional hearing while a retired Army general testified about US progress in Iraq. Retired Army General Jack Keane had testified that since the troop surge began, U.S. forces "are on the offensive and we have the momentum." He also said security has improved in every neighborhood and district in and around Baghdad, and that "cafes, pool halls, coffee houses that I visited are full of people". Boyda said she left the House Armed Services Committee hearing during the testimony of General Keane because "there was only so much that you could take,"  and continued to say she felt Keane's picture of the situation in Iraq was inappropriately "rosy."

Her Chief of Staff Shanan Guinn said, "She was frustrated with how the administration is handling the war, that no one wants to have a real conversation about ways to move forward and our brave men and women overseas are being played like a political ping pong ball."

Boyda later told the Manhattan (Kan.) Mercury, that she did not "walk out" of the meeting. Instead, she "stepped into a little room" adjacent to the meeting for five minutes, then returned.  She hoped to draw a distinction between politely excusing herself and storming out of the room.

Committee assignments 
Armed Services Committee
Subcommittee on Military Personnel
Subcommittee on Readiness
Agriculture Committee
Subcommittee on Conservation, Credit, Energy and Research
Subcommittee on Department Operations, Oversight, Nutrition and Forestry
Subcommittee on General Farm Commodities and Risk Management

Post-congressional career 
Following her term in Congress, Boyda was named by President Barack Obama as the Deputy Assistant Secretary of Defense for Manpower and Personnel at The Pentagon, and was sworn into the position on July 20, 2009.

2020 U.S. Senate campaign 

It was reported in April 2019 that Boyda was exploring a candidacy for the Kansas Senate election in 2020. She subsequently announced her candidacy to seek the Democratic nomination on July 1, 2019. During campaign stops she said finance practices and gerrymandering are big reasons why politicians don't "work across the aisle," and she said her whole campaign is dedicated to breaking gridlock.

Boyda withdrew from the race saying she would begin a non-profit to break partisan divide as opposed to running for the Senate.

Personal life 
Boyda was married to Steve Boyda, a Marine Corps veteran and police officer. She has two children and one granddaughter. She lives on a small farm outside of Baldwin City, Kansas.

See also 
 Women in the United States House of Representatives

References

External links 

Nancy Boyda for Senate, 2020 U.S. Senate campaign site 
Nancy Boyda for Congress, Archived House campaign site
 
 Profile at SourceWatch
 

1955 births
21st-century American chemists
21st-century American politicians
21st-century American women politicians
American United Methodists
Democratic Party members of the United States House of Representatives from Kansas
Female members of the United States House of Representatives
Living people
Politicians from St. Louis
Politicians from Topeka, Kansas
United States Department of Defense officials
William Jewell College alumni
Women in Kansas politics
Chemists from Missouri
Candidates in the 2020 United States Senate elections